The Korea Institute of Science and Technology Information (KISTI), Korea is a government-funded research institute in Daedeok Science Town in Daejeon, South Korea.

Chronology

See also

Korea University of Science and Technology

External links 
 

Research institutes in South Korea
Information technology research institutes